Port Arthur and Kenora was a federal electoral district represented in the House of Commons of Canada from 1917 to 1925. It was located in the province of Ontario. This riding was created in 1914 from parts of Thunder Bay and Rainy River riding.

It consisted of the territorial districts of Thunder Bay, Kenora and Rainy River, excluding parts included in Fort William and Rainy River, and of the district of Patricia.

The electoral district was abolished in 1924 when it was redistributed between Kenora—Rainy River and Port Arthur—Thunder Bay ridings.

Electoral history

|- 
  
|Government
|KEEFER, Francis Henry 
|align="right"| 5,990   
  
|Opposition
|DUNBAR, James Asher 
|align="right"|2,476   
|}

|- 

  
|Conservative
|KEEFER, Francis Henry 
|align="right"| 3,627    
  
|Liberal
|MCCOMBER, Alexander Jarvis 
|align="right"|3,419   
|}

See also 

 List of Canadian federal electoral districts
 Past Canadian electoral districts

External links 

 Website of the Parliament of Canada

Former federal electoral districts of Ontario
Politics of Thunder Bay